Kermack–McKendrick theory is a hypothesis that predicts the number and distribution of cases of an infectious disease as it is transmitted through a population over time. Building on the research of Ronald Ross and Hilda Hudson, A. G. McKendrick and W. O. Kermack published their theory in a set of three articles from 1927, 1932, and 1933.  While Kermack–McKendrick theory was indeed the source of SIR models and their relatives, Kermack and McKendrick were thinking of a more subtle and empirically useful problem than the simple compartmental models discussed here.  The text is somewhat difficult to read, compared to modern papers, but the important feature is it was a model where the age-of-infection affected the transmission and removal rates.

Because of their seminal importance to the field of theoretical epidemiology, these articles were republished in the Bulletin of Mathematical Biology in 1991.

Epidemic model (1927) 
In its initial form, Kermack–McKendrick theory is a partial differential-equation model that structures the infected population in terms of age-of-infection, while
using simple compartments for people who are susceptible (S), infected (I), and recovered/removed (R).
Specified initial conditions would change over time according to
 

 
 

 

where  is a Dirac delta-function and the infection pressure

 

This formulation is equivalent to defining the incidence of infection .
Only in the special case when the removal rate  and the transmission rate  are constant for all ages can the epidemic dynamics be expressed in terms of the prevalence , leading to the standard compartmental SIR model.  This model only accounts for infection and removal events, which are sufficient to describe a simple epidemic, including the threshold condition necessary for an epidemic to start, but can not explain endemic disease transmission or recurring epidemics.

Endemic disease (1932, 1933) 

In their subsequent articles, Kermack and McKendrick extended their theory to allow for birth, migration, and death, as well as imperfect immunity.  In modern notation, their model can be represented as

 

 

 

 

where  is the immigration rate of susceptibles, bj is the per-capita birth rate for state j, mj is the per-capita mortality rate of individuals in state j,  is the relative-risk of infection to recovered individuals who are partially immune, and the infection pressure

 

Kermack and McKendrick were able to show that it admits a stationary solution where disease is endemic, as long as the supply of susceptible individuals is sufficiently large.  This model is difficult to analyze in its full generality, and a number of open questions remain regarding its dynamics.

References 

Epidemiology